William James Johnson (22 September 1884 – 14 August 1941) was a wine and spirit grocer and keen cricketer who played one first-class match for Victoria in 1924–25. He was later a selector of the Australian Test team.  

Johnson's son, Ian, went on to captain the Australian Test cricket team.

Notes

References

External links

1884 births
1941 deaths
Australia national cricket team selectors
Victoria cricketers
Cricketers from Victoria (Australia)